Norbuprenorphine is a major active metabolite of the opioid modulator buprenorphine. It is a μ-opioid, δ-opioid, and nociceptin receptor full agonist, and a κ-opioid receptor partial agonist. In rats, unlike buprenorphine, norbuprenorphine produces marked respiratory depression but with very little antinociceptive effect. In explanation of these properties, norbuprenorphine has been found to be a high affinity P-glycoprotein substrate, and in accordance, shows very limited blood-brain-barrier penetration.

See also
 Norbuprenorphine-3-glucuronide
 Buprenorphine-3-glucuronide
 Loperamide
 Noroxymorphone

References

4,5-Epoxymorphinans
Phenols
Tertiary alcohols
Ethers
Kappa-opioid receptor agonists
Mu-opioid receptor agonists
Delta-opioid receptor agonists
Nociceptin receptor agonists
Opioid metabolites
Peripherally selective drugs